In algebra, a higher-order operad is a higher-dimensional generalization of an operad.

See also 
Opetope

References

External links 
https://ncatlab.org/nlab/show/(infinity%2C1)-operad

Abstract algebra